"Two Less Lonely People in the World" is a song by British/Australian soft rock duo Air Supply, from their 1982 album Now and Forever. It was the third of three singles released from the album.

The song reached number 38 on the US Billboard Hot 100 and number 33 on Cash Box in January 1983. It also charted modestly in Australia. Written by Ken Hirsch and veteran lyricist Howard Greenfield, it provided a rare hit for Greenfield decades after his 1960s heyday, and one of the last before his death.

"Two Less Lonely People in the World" was a hit on adult contemporary radio in Canada and the United States, reaching number two in Canada, and three weeks at number four in the US.

Billboard said that "The group's sentimental sound is so distinctive that the new single is instantly familiar."

Charts

Weekly charts

Year-end charts

References

External links
  (Air Supply)

1982 songs
1983 singles
Air Supply songs
Songs with lyrics by Howard Greenfield
Songs written by Ken Hirsch
Song recordings produced by Harry Maslin
Arista Records singles
1980s ballads
Rock ballads